The Michigan Island Lighthouse is a lighthouse operated by the National Park Service and located on Michigan Island on western Lake Superior in the Apostle Islands National Lakeshore.

History
Two historical lighthouses have served as the Michigan Island light. The older was constructed in 1857, but not activated until 1869. It served until 1929, when it was replaced by a taller,  skeletal tower, which is still operational.

The 3½-order Fresnel lens, coupled with a 24,000-candela electric light and the  focal plane (aided by its placement on a cliff) aided by the tower's location atop the cliff, made the light range of visibility to a "remarkable 22 miles."  This was a relative rarity, being  one of only a dozen used around the country, most of which were on the Great Lakes, These lights were typically reserved for places that were an especially serious hazard to navigation.  See, for example, Sturgeon Point Light. Other Great Lakes lights that had 3½-order Fresnel lenses were at (in alphabetical order): DeTour Reef, Eagle Bluff, Grays Reef, Huron Island, St. Helena Island, and Toledo Harbor.

In 1972, the original Fresnel lens was replaced with a DCB-224 aero beacon manufactured by the Carlisle & Finch Company. In turn, that was replaced by the Tideland Signal ML-300 acrylic optic.  The restored  Fresnel lens is on display at the visitor center of the Apostle Islands National Lakeshore in Bayfield.

The structure shares its design with towers at Rawley Point Light on Lake Michigan and Whitefish Point Light at Lake Superior's eastern end. However, the Michigan Island tower has a small brick building located at the base of the center tube, apparently a workroom for the early lighthouse keepers.

Status
Currently owned by the National Park Service and part of the Apostle Islands National Lakeshore, it is a contributing property of the Apostle Islands Lighthouses, added to the National Register of Historic Places in 1977. It is also listed in the Library of Congress, Historic American Buildings Survey, WI-317 (A-C).

Transportation
Most of the Apostle Islands light stations can be reached on the Apostle Islands Cruise Service water taxi or by private boat during the summer. During the Annual Apostle Island Lighthouse Celebration, a ferry tour service is available for all the lighthouses. During the tourist season, volunteer park rangers are on many of the islands to greet visitors.

See also
Wisconsin lighthouses
Apostle Islands Lighthouses

References

Further reading
 Havighurst, Walter (1943) The Long Ships Passing: The Story of the Great Lakes, Macmillan Publishers.
 Michigan Island: The Mistake that Became a Treasure. Lighthouse Digest (Mar 1999), pp. 21–24.
 
 
 Wobser, David, Michigan Island Lights, Great Laker Magazine, Boatnerd
 Wright, Larry and Wright, Patricia, Great Lakes Lighthouses Encyclopedia Hardback (Erin: Boston Mills Press, 2006) .

External links

 Aerial photos of Michigan Island Light, Marina.com.
 Lighthouse tour preview.
 Old tower Lighthouse friends article.

Lighthouses completed in 1857
Lighthouses completed in 1929
Apostle Islands National Lakeshore
Lighthouses in Ashland County, Wisconsin
Lighthouses on the National Register of Historic Places in Wisconsin
National Register of Historic Places in Ashland County, Wisconsin
1857 establishments in Wisconsin